Ngan Wai is an at-grade MTR Light Rail stop located at Chak Fung Street, between Affluence Garden and Chelsea Heights, in Tuen Mun District. It began service on 18 September 1988 and belongs to Zone 2.

References

MTR Light Rail stops
Former Kowloon–Canton Railway stations
Tuen Mun District
Railway stations in Hong Kong opened in 1988